Buckden may refer to:

Buckden, Cambridgeshire
Buckden, North Yorkshire